Vincent Asokan is an Indian actor who has predominantly appeared in Tamil language films.

Personal life 
Vincent is the son of actor S. A. Ashokan. He is married and has two sons.

Career
Vincent Asokan made his debut in director A. Venkatesh's Aai (2004) and has since played villain in close to 30 films.

He played supporting roles in flicks like 6'2 (2005), Thotti Jaya (2005), Chanakya (2005), Bangaram (2006), Nee Venunda Chellam (2006), Thagapansamy (2006), Pokkiri (2007), Aalwar (2007) and Murugaa (2007). He won the Best Villain Award for his role in Yogi (2009).

In 2014, Vincent also does occasional cameos like in the movie Eppodhum Vendraan, where he plays a cop. In Ennamo Nadakkuthu, director Rajapandi cast him as a boxer. In Thalaivan, directed by Ramesh Selvan he played a very authoritative character of a don. He played a small role in the action thriller Sandamarutham (2015) which also had Sarath Kumar in dual lead roles. In director Cable Shankar's Thottal Thodarum, he achieved another pinnacle of acting by playing the role of a hired assassin with no dialogues and conveying terror via his expressions and menacing looks. Vincent also played a violent person in A. Venkatesh's Killadi (2015). In 2016, he played a supporting role in a suspense-drama film Ennul Aayiram, written and directed by Krishna Kumar.

Filmography

Films

Television

Web series

References

External links 
 

Indian male film actors
Tamil male actors
Living people
Male actors from Chennai
Male actors in Tamil cinema
1965 births